State Route 125 (SR 125) is a primary state highway in the U.S. state of Virginia. SR 125 consists of a  western section and a  eastern section separated by a gap at the Nansemond River. This gap arose when the Kings Highway Bridge across the river was removed in 2008.

Route description

SR 125 begins at an intersection with SR 10 and SR 32 (Godwin Boulevard) in the hamlet of Chuckatuck in the city of Suffolk.  The state highway heads east as a two-lane undivided road that passes historic St. John's Church then veers south to a dead end at Hollidays Point on the Nansemond River at the former site of the Kings Highway Bridge.  SR 125 picks up again at a dead end due south of the western segment's dead end to the north of Nansemond National Wildlife Refuge.  The highway veers east and passes through a forested area to the community of Driver, where the highway reaches its eastern terminus at SR 337 (Nansemond Parkway).  Traveling between Chuckatuck and Driver requires crossing the Nansemond River near its mouth on U.S. Route 17 (US 17) on the Nansemond River Bridge or on one of several crossings of the river at its head of navigation in the center of Suffolk.

Major intersections

References

External links

Virginia Highways Project: VA 125

125
State Route 125